Lasse Gjertsen (born 19 July 1984) is a Norwegian animator, musician, and videographer. He is best known for his short pieces "Hyperactive" and "Amateur", big hits in the early years of YouTube, which strung together short clips of video to create a unique form of video akin to stop-motion animation. His "Hyperactive" video has over 8.9 million views and his "Amateur" video has over 16 million views.

Biography
Gjertsen was born in Larvik, Norway. He studied animation at Kent Institute of Art & Design in England, and at Volda University College in Norway. His time at Kent Institute ended with his teachers failing to appreciate his work, specifically Hyperactive.

YouTube
Lasse originally submitted Hyperactive to YouTube after seeing a copy uploaded by another user with poor sound quality. Over the next six months Lasse uploaded 16 more videos, many created during his animation course.   He has had several videos featured on the YouTube front page, including Hyperactive, What The Fuck?, Amateur, and Sogno ad Occhi Aperti.

While Hyperactive has been the most popular, Amateur was featured in an article in the online edition of the Wall Street Journal.

Another video by Gjertsen has also been featured on YouTube; "Hva faen, Speil?" in which he is looking into a mirror while some of the effects of hallucinogenic mushrooms become apparent through video and audio editing.

Lasse Gjertsen's video Hyperactive was nominated in the category Most Creative video in YouTube's 2006 Video Awards. The video achieved third place.

Hyperactive was copied  by Cartoon Network in an advert for the show Foster's Home for Imaginary Friends. Lasse initially considered legal action but after talking to a lawyer decided it would be too arduous.

It was also spoofed in an advertisement for the 3rd season of the FX TV show It's Always Sunny In Philadelphia. Whether this was done with or without Gjertsen's permission is unclear.

Lasse Gjertsen is also the creator of the soundtrack of the Chaplin Snakker videos on YouTube. Chaplin Snakker is one of his electronic songs, in which the freedom- and awe-inspiring speech of Charlie Chaplin from his movie The Great Dictator (1940) is elevated by the use of music.

Gjertsen also created a parody of Fireman Sam, dubbing his voice over Thief in Pontypandy.

Beyond YouTube
The YouTube success has resulted in offers from international companies like Chevrolet and MTV. However, Gjertsen publicly denounces the concept of advertising, considering it below prostitution, and has refused all such offers.

In addition to his video work, Lasse has a self-produced album of electronica music.

In 2007 Lasse worked on a two-part music video collaboration, named Sogno ad Occhi Aperti, with the Italian Cellist Giovanni Sollima. This was presented at the 8th International Fringe Film Festival in Marzamemi, Italy.  In the same year he directed the music video for the Swedish rapper Timbuktu's song "Get Fizzy".
From 2019, Gjertsen has been working with VFX and voice on the children's show "Minibarna" for the Norwegian broadcaster NRK. Together with colleagues he received the award "Gullruten" for best VFX in may 2021.

Software
Lasse has stated he uses the following software in the creation of his videos:

 Adobe Photoshop
 Adobe Premiere Pro
 Adobe After Effects
 Debugmode WinMorph
 FL Studio

Music
Lasse uses FL Studio to create original compositions in his videos. Although he claims not to have much skill with instruments, he has sampled himself using Drums, Piano, Guitar, Harmonica, and singing.

The only videos without original compositions are the two music videos, Home Sweet Home by Norwegian Rapper Sirius, and Sogno ad Occhi Aperti by Italian Cellist Giovanni Sollima.

YouTube video chronology

2006

2007

2008

2009

2010

See also
YouTube celebrities

References

External links
 Lasse Gjertsen on YouTube
 Lasse Gjertsen on Myspace
 Lasse Gjertsen Exclusive content created for E4

Norwegian animated film directors
Norwegian film directors
Norwegian male comedians
Internet memes
1984 births
Living people
Alumni of the University for the Creative Arts
Norwegian YouTubers
People from Larvik